The MTU Turbomeca Rolls-Royce MTR390 is a turboshaft developed for light helicopter applications by MTU Turbomeca Rolls-Royce (MTR). The engine is designed to power helicopters in the weight range of 5-7 tonnes in both single and twin engine configurations. So far the only application is the Eurocopter Tiger. Test runs of the MTR390 began in 1989 and the first test flight was performed in 1991. The MTR390 received military certification in May 1996 and civil approval in June 1997.

An uprated version, the MTR390-E (Enhanced), is being developed with Spain's ITP.

Variants
MTR390-2C
Production engine
MTR390-E
Enhanced variant under development

Applications

 Eurocopter Tiger

Specifications (MTR390)

See also

References

External links

 Official company page
 MTU MTR390 page
 Rolls-Royce MTR390 page
 Turbomeca MTR390 page
 ITP MTR390-E page (PDF file in English and Spanish)

1980s turboshaft engines
Centrifugal-flow gas turbine engines